Forelius lilloi is a species of ant in the genus Forelius. Described by Cuezzo in 2000, the species is endemic to Argentina.

References

Dolichoderinae
Hymenoptera of South America
Insects described in 2000